The Badouzi Fishing Port is a fish harbor in Zhongzheng District, Keelung, Taiwan.

History
The fish harbor was established in 1975. Recently, the harbor has been developed into a modern recreational fish harbor.

Destinations
The harbor serves as the departure point for Keelung Islet.

Transportation
The fish harbor is accessible within walking distance north west of Haikeguan Station of Taiwan Railways.

See also
 Fisheries Agency
 Zhengbin Fishing Port
 Bisha Fishing Port

References

1975 establishments in Taiwan
Ports and harbors of Keelung
Transport infrastructure completed in 1975